Malcolm McVean (7 March 1871 – 6 June 1907) was a Scottish association footballer who played as a winger. He is notable for having scored Liverpool's first ever goal, in a friendly against Rotherham Town on 1 September 1892, which Liverpool won 7–1.

He started his career with Third Lanark before he was signed by newly formed Liverpool in 1892. As well as scoring their first ever goal, McVean was also Liverpool's captain for their first ever competitive match, in the Lancashire League against Higher Walton on 3 September 1892. Walton did not arrive until forty-five minutes after the scheduled kick-off time, and Liverpool won 8–0.

When Liverpool were admitted to the Football League a year later, it was McVean who scored their first ever goal in the League, in a 2–0 win away from home over Middlesbrough Ironopolis on 2 September 1893. He also scored twice in Liverpool's first ever victory over top flight opposition when Preston North End were beaten 3–2 in a classic FA cup upset in 1894.

In all McVean made 89 league appearances for the Reds, forty-three of them in the top division where he scored eight goals in four seasons from 1893 until 1897 when he spent the end of his fourth, and final league season with Burnley where he made just four appearances.

McVean has the unusual distinction of having experienced promotion or relegation in each of his four seasons in England; Liverpool 1894 – promoted, 1895 – relegated, 1896 – promoted, Burnley, 1897 – relegated.

He left English league football for his native Scotland where he joined Dundee. He also had spells with Bedminster and Clydebank.

References 

1871 births
1907 deaths
Scottish footballers
Association football outside forwards
Vale of Leven F.C. players
Scottish Football League players
Third Lanark A.C. players
Liverpool F.C. players
Burnley F.C. players
Dundee F.C. players
Renton F.C. players
English Football League players
Bedminster F.C. players
Footballers from West Dunbartonshire